Aida Bauyrzhanova (born 13 December 1997) is a Kazakh artistic gymnast.  She is the 2021 Islamic Solidarity Games champion on floor exercise.

Early life
Bauyrzhanova began training in gymnastics in 2005.

Gymnastics career

2012
Bauyrzhanova made her international debut at the 2012 Junior Asian Championships where she helped Kazakhstan finish fourth as a team.  Individually she placed fourth in the all-around.

2013–14
Bauyrzhanova turned senior in 2013.  She competed at the Anadia Challenge Cup and the 2013 Voronin Cup.

At the 2014 Asian Games Bauyrzhanova finished eleventh in the all-around.

2015–17
At the 2015 Asian Championships Bauyrzhanova helped Kazakhstan finish fifth as a team and individually she finished thirteenth in the all-around. Later that year she competed at her first World Championships.  Bauyrzhanova finished 191st in qualifications and did not advance to any event finals.

Bauyrzhanova was unable to compete in international competitions in 2016 or 2017 due to an elbow injury.

2018
Bauyrzhanova returned to international competition at the 2018 Asian Games.  She finished twenty-third in the all-around.  She next competed at the World Championships where she finished 111th during qualifications.

2019
Bauyrzhanova competed at the Melbourne World Cup where she finished seventh on floor exercise.  At the 2019 Asian Championships she finished nineteenth in the all-around.  She next competed at the Summer Universiade but did not qualify for any event finals.  In December Bauyrzhanova competed at the Voronin Cup where she placed sixth in the all-around, fourth on uneven bars, third on balance beam, and second on floor exercise.

2021–22
Most competitions were canceled or postponed in 2020 due to the COVID-19 pandemic.  Bauyrzhanova competed at the Koper Challenge Cup in 2021 where she finished sixth on floor exercise.

Bauyrzhanova competed at the 2022 World Cups in Doha, Cairo, and Baku.  At the Asian Championships Bauyrzhanova finished ninth in the all-around and qualified to compete as an individual at the 2022 World Championships.  Additionally she placed eighth during the balance beam final.

In August Bauyrzhanova competed at the Islamic Solidarity Games alongside Ayazhan Shamshitdinova.  They finished third as a team behind Turkey and Uzbekistan.  Individually Bauyrzhanova placed first on floor exercise, second on balance beam behind Dildora Aripova, and third on uneven bars behind Sevgi Seda Kayışoğlu and Bengisu Yıldız.

Competitive history

References

External links
 

1997 births
Living people
Kazakhstani female artistic gymnasts
Sportspeople from Astana
Gymnasts at the 2014 Asian Games
Gymnasts at the 2018 Asian Games
21st-century Kazakhstani women
Asian Games competitors for Kazakhstan